The 2009 southeastern Australia heat wave was a heat wave that commenced in late January and led to record-breaking prolonged high temperatures in the region. The heat wave is considered one of the, if not the, most extreme in the region's history. During the heat wave, fifty separate locations set various records for consecutive, highest daytime and overnight temperatures. Many locations through the region recorded all-time high temperatures including capital cities Adelaide, which reached its third-highest temperature, and Melbourne, which recorded its highest-ever temperature on record, .

The exceptional heat wave was caused by a slow-moving high-pressure system that settled over the Tasman Sea, with a combination of an intense tropical low located off the North West Australian coast and a monsoon trough over Northern Australia, which produced ideal conditions for hot tropical air to be directed down over southeastern Australia. The heat began in South Australia on 25 January but became more widespread over southeast Australia by 27 January. Higher temperatures returned on the following weekend with Melbourne recording its hottest day since records began in 1855, .

The heat wave generated extreme fire conditions during the peak of the 2008–09 Australian bushfire season, causing many bushfires in the affected region, contributing to the extreme bushfire conditions on 7 February, also known as the Black Saturday bushfires, which claimed 173 lives in Victoria.

Cause
The heat wave was caused by a slow-moving high-pressure system that settled over the Tasman Sea. Coupled with an intense tropical low and a monsoon trough over Northern Australia, this produced hot, tropical air to be directed over southeastern Australia, raising temperatures significantly. The CSIRO stated that "The warm lower tropospheric anticyclone is the key synoptic weather system responsible for the heat-waves." The heat wave was the worst in Australia's history.

Records and statistics

Adelaide, South Australia
Average daily maximum 27 January – 7 February:  – (11.1 °C (20.0 °F) above average)
13 Consecutive days over 
6 Consecutive days over 
4 Consecutive days over

Melbourne, Victoria
Average daily maximum 27 January – 7 February:  – (10.1 °C (18.2 F) above average)
12 Consecutive days over 
5 Consecutive days over 
3 Consecutive days over

Mildura, Victoria
12 Consecutive days over 
5 Consecutive days over

Wagga Wagga, New South Wales
14 Consecutive days over 
13 Consecutive days over 
4 Consecutive days over

Temperatures (Daily Maximum)

Avalon, Victoria
January 2009
27th – 
28th – 
29th – 
30th – 
February
7th –  (record high, 2.1 °C higher than previous record)

Ceduna, South Australia
January 2009
27th – 
28th – 
29th – 
30th – 
31st – 
February
1st – 
2nd – 
3rd – 
4th – 
5th – 
6th –

Mildura, Victoria

January 2009
26th – 
27th – 
28th – 
29th – 
30th – 
31st – 
February
1st – 
2nd – 
3rd – 
4th – 
5th – 
6th – 
7th –  – 12th consecutive day over 40 °C
8th –

Deniliquin, New South Wales
January 2009
26th – 
27th – 
28th – 
29th – 
30th – 
31st – 
February
1st – 
2nd – 
3rd – 
4th – 
5th – 
6th – 
7th –

Swan Hill, Victoria
January 2009
26th – 
27th – 
28th – 
29th – 
30th – 
31st – 
February
1st – 
2nd – 
3rd – 
4th – 
5th – 
6th – 
7th –

Melbourne, Victoria

Temperatures have been recorded since in 1855.

January 2009
27th – 
28th – 
29th – 
30th –  – Third-hottest day recorded in Melbourne.
31st – 
February
1st – 
2nd – 
3rd – 
4th – 
5th – 
6th – 
7th –  – Hottest day recorded in Melbourne 0.8 °C hotter than previous record (Friday, 13 January 1939).

Adelaide, South Australia
January 2009
26th – 
27th – 
28th – 
29th – 
30th – 
31st – 
February
1st – 
2nd – 
3rd – 
4th – 
5th – 
6th – 
7th – 

A record-high minimum temperature was recorded at around midnight on 29 January, when the temperature dropped to only  at the Bureau of Meteorology weather station in Kent Town, near the Adelaide city centre. Temperatures recorded in other parts of the city and other towns throughout South Australia were even higher.

Woomera, South Australia
January 2009
25th – 
26th – 
27th – 
28th – 
29th – 
30th – 
31st – 
February
1st – 
2nd – 
3rd – 
4th – 
5th – 
6th – 
7th  – 46.2

Wagga Wagga, New South Wales

January 2009
26th – 
27th – 
28th – 
29th – 
30th – 
31st – 
February
1st – 
2nd – 
3rd – 
4th – 
5th – 
6th – 
7th –  – Hottest day recorded in Wagga Wagga since records began in 1941.
8th – 

On 31 January 2009 Wagga Wagga broke the all-time January record for the most days above  with six days recorded (the record previously being five days, which was set in 1952 and equalled in 1979 and 2001). The January record set in 1979 was equalled for number of days above  or more which is 19 days.

Wagga Wagga broke the all-time record and the February record for the highest recorded maximum on 7 February 2009, 2:50pm AEDT the city recorded  with the previous February record being  set on 1 February 1968 and the all time previously being  set on 23 January 2001.

Albury–Wodonga, NSW/VIC
January 2009
26th – 
27th – 
28th – 
29th – 
30th – 
31st – 
February
1st – 
2nd – 
3rd – 
4th – 
5th – 
6th – 
7th –  – Hottest day recorded in Albury–Wodonga since records began in 1973.
8th –

Ballarat, Victoria
January 2009
28th – 
29th – 
30th – 
February
7th –  (record-high, 2.1 °C higher than previous record)

Canberra, ACT
January 2009
28th – 
29th – 
30th – 
31st – 
February
1st – 
2nd – 
3rd – 
4th – 
5th – 
6th – 
7th – 
8th –

Launceston, Tasmania
January 2009
28th – 
29th – 
30th –  – Hottest day recorded in Launceston since records began in 1980.
31st –

Accompanying bushfires

After a slow start to the 2008–09 Australian bushfire season, the high temperatures and wind precipitated several bushfires across Victoria and South Australia. The conditions were very similar to the heat wave experienced in early January 1939, which killed 438 people and precipitated the Black Friday bushfires of 1939.

Fires were also started in the Australian Alps by lightning strikes from dry thunderstorms in north-east Victoria and south-east New South Wales.

The tail end of the heat wave also precipitated the Black Saturday bushfires, in which 173 people died, 414 injured and 2,029 houses destroyed at various locations across the state. Several locations around the state recorded their highest temperatures since records began in 1859 and winds gusted up to 110 km/h.

Comparison to normal climate for the area

Coastal regions and the ACT experienced slightly lower temperatures; however, these were still above average and lasted for a prolonged period.

The heat wave was perhaps most extreme in northern and eastern Tasmania, where 7 of the 8 highest temperatures recorded in Tasmania up to that time occurred during the heat wave.

A chart of the variation of maximum and minimum daily temperatures, through the year, for Melbourne was prepared from observations between May 1855 and August 2006.

Effects

Energy
Localised power outages occurred throughout both cities during the week at varying times for various lengths. It is estimated that over 500,000 residents in Melbourne were without power for the evening of 30 January 2009. The outage affected much of central Melbourne with train and tram services cancelled, the evacuation of Crown Casino, traffic light failures, people being rescued from lifts and patrons of the Victorian Arts Centre evacuated and shows cancelled. The outage occurred only an hour after the National Electricity Market Management Company (NEMMCO) issued a statement saying load shedding was ending and power had been restored.

Blackouts also occurred in the city's west, caused by the three-day heat wave. It is believed an explosion at South Morang contributed to the power problems along three transmission lines supplying Victoria's west and Victorian power supplier SP AusNet shed 1,000 megawatts. On the 30th, Energy Minister Peter Batchelor announced consumers who lose power for more than 20 hours would be eligible for compensation.

Areas that didn't experience blackouts still had problems with abnormally low voltage (probably due to increased air-conditioner usage).

As of 1 February, the heat wave is estimated to have cost the Victorian economy $100m during the week.

Transport
Over the course of the week, thousands of train and tram services were cancelled in both cities, with more than 1,300 individual train services cancelled in metropolitan Melbourne alone. The cancellations were due to buckling rail lines, air conditioner failures and power outages. On the 30th, all public transport in the city was free as the government admitted responsibility for failing to provide adequate infrastructure elements to cope with the heat, as well as long-standing issues with underfunding. On the 30th, 730 (40%) of rail services were cancelled, the worst day of operation since Connex took control in 2004.

2009 Australian Open
Several outdoor matches during the 2009 Australian Open on the 29th and the 30th were cancelled due to the heat. A number of players, including number 3 seed Novak Djokovic, cited the temperature as reason for withdrawing from matches. Serena Williams was quoted as saying it was so hot on court she felt like she was having an "out-of-body experience". After these retirements and an intensification in the heat, the organisers responded by closing the roof and allowing players longer breaks and icepacks.

Human health
There is dispute between sources as to how many people were affected by the heat wave. Hundreds were treated for heat-related illness and 6 fatalities were confirmed, and a number of "sudden deaths" were suspected to be caused by the heat. Authorities worked through each case to determine exactly how many fatalities were directly attributable to the heat wave.

Commercial news sources vary widely at the number of fatalities, some report only 2 deaths, while others speculate that the toll may ultimately be higher. Fifty-seven deaths were suspected to have occurred in South Australia and 33 in Victoria, however authorities preferred to wait for coronial reports before confirming how many were directly attributable to the heat wave.

The Victorian state coroner announced a tripling of dead bodies being placed in the state mortuary during the heat wave, filling the morgue to capacity. Hospitals and funeral homes were relied upon to provide temporary storage of corpses, even before the deaths associated with the Black Saturday bushfires created additional demand for mortuary space.

Throughout the heat wave, thousands of people, many of them elderly, were confirmed to have been treated by ambulance officers and placed in hospitals for heat-related illnesses in Victoria and South Australia. Ambulance Victoria reported a 70% increase in emergency calls during the week. It is estimated that around 2,000 people across Victoria and South Australia were treated for heat stroke and other effects of the heat wave.

According to a Monash University study of funeral notices, more than 200 people died as a result of the heat wave. A 45% increase in the death rate was noted during the time. A subsequent report by Victoria's chief health officer, Dr John Carnie, put the final figure at 374.

Fauna and flora
Baby birds, possums and bats were among the wildlife not coping in the extreme heat. The RSPCA received five times the usual number of admissions to its shelters in Melbourne, with 50 possums admitted to the Burwood East shelter alone.

There were many reports of koalas wandering into urban yards and houses to drink water offered by residents. This behaviour is highly unusual as the animals do not normally drink water and are naturally shy of people.

In Melbourne, a city where most trees are non-native, notably the plane trees that line many inner and middle suburban streets, deciduous trees began shedding their leaves by early February, creating the appearance of an early autumn. Water restrictions meant many trees and plants were already stressed, and some street trees and trees in parks where councils had not arranged special watering, died, or suffered die back, as did trees and plants in private gardens.

See also
 Extreme weather events in Melbourne
2008–09 Australian bushfire season
Black Saturday bushfires
Other notable Australian heat waves:
Black Friday bushfires – 438 deaths
1895–96, southeastern states – 437 deaths
1907–08, southeastern states – 246 deaths

References

External links 
 Heatwaves – Get The Facts, Emergency Management Australia
 NASA – MODIS Exceptional Australian Heat Wave
 The exceptional January–February 2009 heatwave in south-eastern Australia, BOM
 The Age newspaper article, 26 February 2009, Anatomy of a Firestorm, by William Kininmonth, on the conditions and air movements of 7 February 2009.
 
Southeastern Australia heat wave
Southeastern Australia heat wave, 2009 early
Heat waves in Australia